Syed Muhammad Abbas Jafri is a Pakistani politician and model. Jafri is two times Best Male Model Lux Style Awards winner and one time Hum Awards winner.

Jafri contested 2018 elections for Sindh Assembly's Constituency PS-125 (Karachi) as a candidate of Pakistan Tehreek-e-Insaf. He won the election bagging 30,687 votes.

Career 
Abbas Jafri started his career in cricket and had played in Pakistan Under-19 cricket team for some years. He also played in domestic cricket tournaments. Later in 2001 he got offers for fashion industry so he joined modeling industry and has been seen in different fashion events and shows.

Awards and nominations 
 Winner - 10th Lux Style Awards - Model of the Year (Male), 2011
 Winner - 11th Lux Style Awards - Model of the Year (Male), 2012
 Winner - 1st Hum Awards - Best Model (Male), 2013

References

External links 
 Abbas Jafri at the Fashion47

Living people
Pakistani male models
Lux Style Award winners
Hum Award winners
Pakistan Tehreek-e-Insaf MPAs (Sindh)
Sindh MPAs 2018–2023
1987 births